The Great Storm of 1824 (or Great Gale) was a hurricane force wind and storm surge that affected the south coast of England from 22 November 1824.

At Sidmouth, low-lying houses along the Esplanade were inundated, and cottages at the exposed west end were destroyed.  The  sea-stack at Chit Rock was destroyed.

It destroyed the esplanade at Weymouth; it broke across Chesil Beach and the Fleet Lagoon, almost destroying the villages of Fleet and Chiswell.
In Lyme Regis it topped the Cobb, and destroyed about 90m of its length.

The ferry between the Isle of Portland and the mainland was washed away.

The quays at Weymouth were overcome and most properties on the seafront and much of the lower part of the town were flooded by the deluge. The pier at the entrance of the harbour also sustained considerable damage, whilst boats and vessels were carried into the streets by the waves, where they drifted helplessly.

References

1824 in England
1824 natural disasters 
European windstorms
Floods in England
History of the English Channel
Weather events in England
November 1824 events
1824 meteorology
19th century in Dorset
Disasters in Devon
Disasters in Dorset
1824 disasters in the United Kingdom